This is a list of Santa Clara Broncos football players in the NFL Draft.

Key

Selections

References

Santa Clara

Santa Clara Broncos NFL Draft